The Surrey Advertiser is a newspaper for Surrey, England which was established in 1864 and gradually evolved into the Surrey Advertiser Group of seven more localised titles. Guardian Media Group sold the Group to Trinity Mirror in 2010. The owners are now known as Reach plc. The head office is in Stoke Mill, Guildford.

In March 2009 the News and Mail Series ended in the light of the more recent parallel titles within the same group which covered the same areas, principally the  Surrey Herald: (various locality editions) and Guardian series.  These three current titles, altogether, have the highest local paper circulation in Surrey.  The series has moved universally to colour format.  The Group is collectively branded also as the Get Surrey group, particularly its web presence.

Its history is one of multiple acquisitions to expand its territory. The largest single expansion was in 2009 when GMG bought the Esher News & Mail Group another broadsheet weekly newspaper first published in 1936.  This added five editions, covering towns in the Elmbridge borough of Surrey.

Newspapers

Surrey Advertiser
The primary newspaper is the weekly Surrey Advertiser itself with seven regional versions (Guildford, Cranleigh, Godalming, Woking, Elmbridge, Leatherhead, and Dorking).
The group also produces other, more local, series including the
Aldershot News & Mail series. The Surrey Advertiser and the Woking News & Mail were acquired by Surrey and Berkshire Media, a branch of the Guardian Media Group. However, The Surrey Advertiser and associated papers were sold to Trinity Mirror in April while the latter title and the Review series are the only regional paper that remain with the Guardian Media Group.

Surrey Herald
The more localised series covers the less rurally buffered north of the county and its titles are:
 Surrey Herald:
 Walton and Weybridge edition
 Sunbury and Shepperton edition
 Staines, Ashford & Egham edition
 Chertsey & Addlestone edition

Surrey Times Series
Surrey Times currently refers to three newspapers: the Guildford Times, Godalming Times, and the Cranleigh Times. The papers, established in 1855 and now published and printed by Surrey & Berkshire Media Ltd, are distributed free to local residents, with a verified free distribution over thirty-two thousand copies.

Operational aspects

Website

In 2008 the Surrey Advertiser group of Trinity Mirror Group launched its website: Get Surrey which is also used to describe the Group succinctly and its jobs site: GetTheJob

In 2018 the online website was rebranded to Surrey Live while still retaining the original domain name

Awards

In October 2009 the Surrey Advertiser won two awards at the EDF Energy London and the South of England Media Awards 2009.

The Surrey Advertiser was joint winner of the Community Campaign of the Year award, alongside the Gravesend and Dartford Messenger.

At just under 17 months old, Get Surrey won its award at the first time of asking, the judges remarking that the website “turned a weekly into a daily”.

History

Former News and Mail Series
The Esher News & Mail was a broadsheet weekly newspaper first published in 1936.

It grew beyond its initial parochial catchment into five editions for towns in the Elmbridge borough of Surrey, England.

The editions were:
 Esher News & Mail
 Walton and Hersham News & Mail
 Cobham News & Mail
 Molesey News & Mail
 Weybridge News & Mail

It was part of the Surrey Advertiser Group, owned by the Guardian Media Group

In March 2009 its closure was announced as part of the restructuring plans of the owning group who opened parallel titles which cover the same areas, principally instead its Surrey Herald: (various locality editions) and Guardian series.  The relevant replacements have moved to colour, tabloid format.

See also

References

External links
 Surrey Advertiser Website
 GetTheJob Website

Newspapers published in Surrey
Publications established in 1864
1864 establishments in England
Newspapers published by Reach plc